
Gmina Murowana Goślina is an urban-rural gmina (administrative district) in Poznań County, Greater Poland Voivodeship, in west-central Poland. The gmina consists of Murowana Goślina and the countryside and villages mainly to the north and east of that town. Much of the eastern part of the gmina is covered by the forests of the Puszcza Zielonka Landscape Park.

Villages
Apart from the town of Murowana Goślina, the gmina contains the villages and settlements of Białęgi, Białężyn, Boduszewo, Długa Goślina, Głębocko, Głęboczek, Kamińsko, Łopuchówko, Łopuchowo, Łoskoń Stary, Mściszewo, Nieszawa, Pławno, Przebędowo, Raduszyn, Rakownia, Starczanowo, Trojanowo, Uchorowo, Wojnówko, Wojnowo, Zielonka and Złotoryjsko.

Neighbouring gminas
Gmina Murowana Goślina is bordered by Gmina Oborniki, Gmina Rogoźno and Gmina Skoki to the north, Gmina Kiszkowo to the east, Gmina Pobiedziska to the south-east, Gmina Czerwonak to the south, and Gmina Suchy Las to the west. In the last case the boundary runs along the river Warta and has no crossing points.

External links
 Map of Gmina Murowana Goślina

References
Polish official population figures 2006

Murowana Goslina
Poznań County